Solo

 1985 Champion (Passport Jazz)
 1986 Pump It! (Passport Jazz)
 1997 Taking Notes (Denon)
 1998 Crossroads (Denon)
 2000 Star Licks Master Sessions: Jeff Berlin (Star Licks Productions) (VHS)
 2000 In Harmony's Way (M.A.J. Records, multiple re-releases)
 2004 Lumpy Jazz (M.A.J.)
 2006 Aneurythms/Ace of Bass (M.A.J.)
 2006 Mel Bay Jeff Berlin-Bass Logic from the Players School of Music (Mel Bay Publications) (DVD)
 2010 High Standards (King Japan / M.A.J.)
 2013 Low Standards (Random Act)
 2022 Jack Songs (Jeff Berlin Music Group)

As sideman

 1976 Patrick Moraz – The Story of I (Charisma (UK), Atlantic (US/Canada), Voiceprint (reissue))
 1976 Esther Phillips – Capricorn Princess
 1976 Patti Austin – End of a Rainbow (CTI)
 1976 David Matthews with Whirlwind - Shoogie Wanna Boogie (CTI)
 1977 Ray Barretto – Eye of the Beholder (Atlantic)
 1977 David Liebman – Light'n Up, Please! (A&M)
 1977 Ernie Krivda – Satanic (Inner City)
 1977  Bruford – Feels Good to Me
 1978 Don Pullen – Montreux Concert (Atlantic)
 1979 David Sancious – Just As I Thought
 1979 Bruford – One of a Kind (Winterfold)
 1980 Bruford – Gradually Going Tornado (Winterfold)
 1980 Passport - Lifelike
 1980 Joe Diorio – 20th Century Impressions
 1981 Bruford – The Bruford Tapes (Winterfold)
 1981 Herbie Mann – Mellow
 1983 Allan Holdsworth – Road Games
 1983 Janis Ian – Uncle Wonderful
 1984 Clare Fischer and Salsa Picante – Crazy Bird
 1985 Shumate-Reno Jazz Quintet – Hurricane
 1986 Bruford - Master Strokes: 1978–1985
 1986 T Lavitz – Storytime
 1987 Henderson-Berlin-Smith-Lavitz – Players
 1987 Kazumi Watanabe – The Spice of Life
 1988 Kazumi Watanabe – The Spice of Life Too
 1993 k.d. lang – Even Cowgirls Get the Blues
 1993 Anderson Bruford Wakeman Howe – An Evening of Yes Music Plus
 1994 Nathan Cavaleri Band – Nathan
 1995 Richie Kotzen – The Inner Galactic Fusion Experience
 1995 Michael Zentner – Playtime
 2002 Novecento – Featuring...
 2006 Chambers - Jeff Berlin-Fiuczynski-Lavitz – Boston T Party
 2006 Bruford – Rock goes to College - (2006 DVD Winterfold Records)
 2012 Henderson-Berlin-Chambers – HBC (Tone Center)
 2013 Nick Miller – My Memories

References

Jazz discographies
Discographies of American artists